This is a list of the 18 appointed members of the European Parliament for Bulgaria in the 2004 to 2009 session. They were appointed by the National Assembly to be observers from 25 September 2005 until 31 December 2006 (one day before the accession of Bulgaria to the European Union). The observers group included 6 women. 7 of them joined ALDE, 6 joined PES, 4 joined EPP-ED, while remaining representant of Attack became member of Non-Inscrits.

List

2007
Bulgaria
Bulgaria
List